Frederick William Chapman (November 17, 1806 – July 20, 1876) was an American minister and genealogist.

Chapman, elder son of Abisha and Mary (Goss) Chapman, was born in Canfield, Ohio, November 17, 1806.  He graduated from Yale College in 1828. He taught the academy in Sharon, Conn., for the year after graduation, and spent the three succeeding years in the Divinity School of Yale College.

He was ordained pastor of the Congregational Church in Stratford, Conn., September 5, 1832, and resigned this charge, May 16, 1839, to accept a call from the Congregational Church in Deep River (in Saybrook), Conn., where he was installed May 29. From this charge he was dismissed, October 1, 1850, and on October 24 was installed over the Congregational Church in South Glastonbury, Conn., where he remained until October 29, 1854. He then became the principal of the high school in Ellington, Conn., and so continued until 1863, supplying in the meantime the church in West Stafford, Conn., for four and a half years (1856–61), and afterwards the church in Bolton, Conn., to which town he next removed. Leaving Bolton in 1864, he supplied the pulpit of the Union Church in East Hampton, Conn., for two years, and for five years had charge of the church in Prospect, Conn.

In 1871 he removed to Rocky Hill, Conn., and devoted himself thenceforth to genealogical researches. He had already published, in 1854, a genealogy of the Chapman Family, and in 1864 one of the Pratt Family. Four more volumes compiled by him were printed,—the Trowbridge and Buckingham genealogies in 1872, the Coit genealogy in 1873, and the Bulkeley genealogy in 1875. In August 1873, a stroke of paralysis impaired his faculties, but he continued to work until a second stroke, in October 1875, which deprived him of speech, and left him to pass the remaining months in feebleness of body and mind, until his death, at his residence in Rocky Hill, July 20, 1876, in his 70th year.

He was married, May 6, 1833, to Emily, eldest child of Henry Hill, of Westbrook, Conn, who died in South Glastonbury, of apoplexy, March 30, 1854, aged 44 years. He married secondly, November 7, 1855, Caroline, widow of John Crooks, of East Longmeadow, Mass., and daughter of Samuel Strickland, of Ellington, Conn., who survived him. Of the three children by his first marriage, one son only survived him.

External links
Books by Chapman
 

1806 births
1876 deaths
Yale Divinity School alumni
American Congregationalist ministers
American genealogists
American male non-fiction writers
People from Canfield, Ohio
People from Stratford, Connecticut
People from Ellington, Connecticut
People from Rocky Hill, Connecticut
19th-century American clergy
Historians from Ohio
Historians from Connecticut